Copperhead is a 2013 drama film directed by Ron Maxwell and starring Billy Campbell, Angus Macfadyen, Augustus Prew, Lucy Boynton, Casey Thomas Brown, and Peter Fonda. The film is based on the 19th-century novel The Copperhead by Harold Frederic. The film was shot at Kings Landing Historical Settlement in New Brunswick, Canada and is set in upstate New York. It was released in the United States on June 28, 2013 to poor reviews and critical responses.

Plot
Set in 1862 in a rural upstate New York community referred to as "The Corners", Abner Beech (Campbell) is a dairy farmer and an antiwar Democrat, sharing quarters with the Irish Hurley family. While his neighbors take up the Union cause in the ongoing American Civil War, Beech believes that coercion in resisting the secession of the southern states is unconstitutional and not worth risking the lives of so many young men, gradually becomes more and more harassed for his views, derisively called a "Copperhead." Abner's son, Thomas Jefferson "Jeff" Beech enlists in the Union Army to impress a girl he likes, Esther Hagadorn (Lucy Boynton), the daughter of radical abolitionist Jee Hagadorn (Macfadyen), who works to turn the community against Abner. 

Esther visits the Beeches one evening to warn them over dinner that a violent mob, including her father, is coming to retaliate against Beech following the election of anti-war Democrats such as Horatio Seymour to the Governorship and downballot county offices. As the mob starts shooting at and setting fire to the farmhouse, Abner tells Esther to escape through the backdoor, but the house is shrouded in smoke and the door is jammed, prompting Esther to hide in the wine cellar. Later that evening, the Beech family is taking shelter in their barn and are visited by Jee who is looking for his daughter. Finding Esther's locket in the smoldering rubble of the farmhouse, Esther is believed dead in the fire, causing a distraught Jee to commit suicide. Esther is soon found passed out, but recovers in time for Jeff to return home from the war (Esther's brother, Ni, went south to check Jeff's whereabouts and rescue him from a prison camp).

Cast
 Billy Campbell as Abner Beech
 Angus Macfadyen as Jee Hagadorn
 Augustus Prew as Ni Hagadorn
 Lucy Boynton as Esther Hagadorn
 Peter Fonda as Avery, the community blacksmith
 Key Williams as Neels Robert
 Casey Thomas Brown as Thomas Jefferson "Jeff" Beech, son of Abner and M'Rye 
 François Arnaud as Warner Pitts
 Josh Cruddas as Jimmy Hurley, Irish son of Mick and roommate to the Beeches
 Genevieve Steele as M'Rye Beech, Abner's wife and Jeff's mother
 Ryan Doucette as Byron Truax

Production
The film had the working title Copperhead: The War at Home. Filmed at Kings Landing Historical Settlement in New Brunswick, Canada, Jason Patric initially starred, but was replaced by Billy Campbell after production commenced due to what director Maxwell called "creative differences". Copperhead was produced by Ron Maxwell and co-produced by John Houston.

Reception

Box office
Copperhead opened in limited theatrical release June 28, 2013, playing in 59 theaters and was simultaneously released in video-on-demand platforms including Amazon Video.  The film ultimately grossed $171,740.

Critical response
On review aggregator Rotten Tomatoes holds an approval rating of 21% based on 19 reviews, and an average rating of 4.74/10. On Metacritic, which uses a weighted average, the film has a score of 34 out of 100, based on 12 critics, indicating "generally unfavorable reviews".

Stephanie Merry of The Washington Post gave the film two out of four stars, remarking, "The story offers uncommon insights on the endlessly parsed period in history, but its execution sometimes falls short. Both the production quality and the persistent, sentimental soundtrack create a made-for-TV feel"  Mark Olsen of the Los Angeles Times shared similar criticism, opining, "Where Tony Kushner's screenplay for Steven Spielberg's Lincoln found energetic drama in political wrangling and historical events, Copperhead crams far too much of its action into its last 30 minutes after a rambling, drawn-out set up. Painfully lugubrious, any sting Copperhead might contain for its contrarian's view of history is undone by its wayward sense of storytelling."

Christine N. Ziemba of Paste magazine wrote Copperhead a fairly mixed review, stating "Despite good performances throughout the film, the pacing of Copperhead is slow, with many long takes and establishing shots that seem a bit over-indulgent, as if to remind viewers that they're watching an 'important, yet little-known, historical drama.'"  Despite ultimately giving the movie a mixed review, John DeFore of The Hollywood Reporter optimistically stated, "Theatrical prospects are meager [...], but history buffs may appreciate its earnest look at an underexplored subject on small screens."

Relation to director's previous works
Copperhead is Maxwell's third Civil War film, though the director does not consider it to be part of the trilogy he has planned along with Gettysburg (1993) and Gods and Generals (2003), as he expects to conclude the series with a final film based on Jeff Shaara's The Last Full Measure.

See also

References

External links
 Official site
 
 

2013 films
Films shot in New Brunswick
Films set in New York (state)
American Civil War films
Films directed by Ronald F. Maxwell
Films based on American novels
2010s English-language films
2010s American films